The 1995 Pan American Games were held in Mar del Plata, Argentina, from March 12 to March 26, 1995. After 44 years, this was the Pan American Games first return to the country that hosted the first Games, in 1951.

Overview
The seaside resort city of Mar del Plata hosted the XII Pan American Games. The city of 600,000 is located 400 km south of Buenos Aires. Welcoming 5,144 athletes from 42 countries of PASO community, events were held in 34 different sports. The Games were held early by Northern Hemisphere standards, but at the end of summer in the Southern Hemisphere.

Organizers spread the 1995 games throughout Argentina, including Buenos Aires, Parana, and Mar del Plata.

Bidding process 

One Mar del Plata submitted a bid to host the 1995 Pan American Games that was recognized by the Pan American Sports Organization (OPEPA). Honoring an agreement that was made after Mar del Plata withdrew their bid for the 1991 Pan American Games, OPEDA selected Mar del Plata as the host city for the 1995 games at the ODEPA Assembly in Havana, Cuba in October 1989.

Venues

Mar del Plata

 Estadio José María Minella: Opening and Closing ceremonies, Football
 Justo Román Athletic stadium: Athletics
 Polideportivo Islas Malvinas: Basketball, Volleyball
 Municipal Velodrome: Cycling
 Pan American Field Hockey Stadium: Field Hockey
 Alberto Zorrilla Natatorium: Swimming
 Patinódromo Municipal: Roller sports (skating)
 Laguna de los Padres: Rowing, Canoeing

Mascot and logo

The mascot, Lobi, is a sea lion, an animal commonly found in the waters of Mar de Plata. He stands for the host city and is displayed with welcoming open arms. The words in the poster are constructed to imply a launching point or podium.

Medal count 

To sort this table by nation, total medal count, or any other column, click on the  icon next to the column title.

Note
 The medal count for the United States is disputed.

Sports

  Archery
  Athletics
  Badminton
  Baseball
  Basketball
  Basque pelota
  Bowling
  Boxing
  Canoeing
  Cycling
  Diving
  Equestrian
  Fencing
  Field Hockey
  Football
  Gymnastics (artistic)
  Gymnastics (rhythmic)
  Handball
  Judo
  Karate
  Racquetball
  Roller sports (skating)
  Roller sports (hockey)
  Rowing
  Sailing
  Shooting
  Softball
  Squash
  Swimming
  Synchronized swimming
  Table tennis
  Taekwondo
  Tennis
  Triathlon
  Volleyball
  Water polo
  Water skiing
  Weightlifting
  Wrestling

The sports of basque pelota, karate, racquetball, squash, triathlon and water skiing appeared on the schedule for the first time.

References

External links

 Mar del Plata 1995 - XII Pan American Games - Official Report at PanamSports.org

 
P
P
Sport in Mar del Plata
Multi-sport events in Argentina
Pan American Games
Pan American Games
March 1995 sports events in South America